The Vijay for Best Comedian is given by STAR Vijay as part of its annual Vijay Awards ceremony for Tamil  (Kollywood) films.

The list
Here is a list of the award winners and the films for which they won.

Nominations
2008 Kamal Haasan - Dasavathaaram
M. S. Bhaskar - Velli Thirai
Premji Amaren - Saroja
Vivek - Kuruvi
2009 Santhanam - Siva Manasula Sakthi
Ganja Karuppu - Naadodigal
Jegan - Ayan
Namo Narayana - Naadodigal 
Vadivelu - Aadhavan
2010 Santhanam - Boss Engira Bhaskaran
Ganja Karuppu - Kalavani
M. S. Bhaskar & Chams - Irumbukkottai Murattu Singam
Vadivelu - Nagaram
Vivek - Singam
2011 Santhanam - Siruthai and Kovai Sarala - Muni 2: Kanchana
Santhanam - Deiva Thirumagal
Vadivelu - Kaavalan
Vivek - Mappillai
2012 Santhanam - Oru Kal Oru Kannadi
Karunas - Kazhugu
Sathyan - Nanban
Soori - Sundarapandian
VTV Ganesh - Poda Podi
 2013 Santhanam - Theeya Velai Seiyyanum Kumaru
 Powerstar Srinivasan - Kanna Laddu Thinna Aasaiya
 Sathish - Ethir Neechal
 Soori - Varuthapadatha Valibar Sangam
 Vivek - Singam II
 2014 Thambi Ramaiah - Kathai Thiraikathai Vasanam Iyakkam
 Karunakaran - Yaamirukka Bayamey
 Ramadoss - Mundasupatti
 Santhanam - Aranmanai
 Vivek - Velaiyilla Pattathari

See also
 Tamil cinema
 Cinema of India

References

Comedian